The Men's 200 metres at the 2014 Commonwealth Games, as part of the athletics programme, took place at Hampden Park on 30 and 31 July 2014.

Records

Heats

First 2 in each heat (Q) and 4 best losers (q) advance to the Semifinals

Heat 1

Heat 2

Heat 3

Heat 4

Heat 5

Heat 6

Heat 7

Heat 8

Heat 9

Heat 10

Semifinals

Heat 1

Heat 2

Heat 3

Final

References
General
Men's 200m – Qualification Standings
Specific

Men's 200 metres
2014